Burqin is a Palestinian town in the northern West Bank located 5 km west of Jenin.  According to the Palestinian Central Bureau of Statistics (PCBS) census, its population was 5,685 in 2007. The majority of Burqin's residents are Muslims, and 20 Christian families live in the town. The Byzantine-era Burqin Church or St. George's Church is  one of the oldest churches in the world.

History
Burqin is an ancient site, situated on a slope, with old stones reused in the town houses.

It was mentioned under the name Burqana, in the 14th century BCE Amarna letters, as one of several cities conquered by the Canaanite warlord Lab'ayu in the Dothan Valley and southern Jezreel Valley.

Pottery sherds from the Early Bronze I, Early Bronze IIB, Late Bronze III, Iron Age I, Iron Age II, late Roman, Byzantine,  Umayyad/Abbasid, Medieval and early Ottoman era have been found.

Ottoman era

In 1517, the village was included in the Ottoman Empire with the rest of Palestine, and in the 1596 tax-records it appeared as Bruqin, located in the Nahiya of Jabal Sami of the Liwa of Nablus. The population was 23 households and 4 bachelors, all Muslim. They paid a tax rate of 33.3% on agricultural products, which included wheat, barley, summer crops, olive trees, occasional revenues, goats and beehives; a total of 7980 akçe.

In 1799, Pierre Jacotin placed the village, named Berkin, nearly straight west of Jenin on his map. In 1838 Edward Robinson placed Burqin as  being in the District of Jenin, also called "Haritheh esh-Shemaliyeh".

In 1863, when Victor Guérin visited, he found the village to have about 1,000 inhabitants, all Muslim with the exception of 90 Greek Orthodox Christians. He further noted that "Some  30 excavated cisterns are evidence that this village sits upon an ancient settlement."

In 1872, Claude Reignier Conder visited Burqin during his surveying work in Palestine. He was met by the local curé and shown the church. It had a stone screen on the east, shutting off three apses.

In 1882, the PEF's Survey of Western Palestine described Burkin as "A village of Greek Christians, with a small modern church for the Greek rite. It stands on the side of a white hill, with a good well below on the north, and olives near it."

British Mandate era

In the 1922 census of Palestine, conducted by the British Mandate authorities, Burqin had a population of 883; 871 Muslims and 12 Christians males, where all the Christians were Orthodox. This had increased  in the 1931 census to a population of 1,086;  1,010 Muslim and 76 Christians, in a total of 227 inhabited houses.

In the 1945 statistics the population were 1,540; 1,430 Muslims and 110 Christians, with a total of 19,447  dunams of land, according to an official land and population survey. Of this, 3,902 dunams were used for  plantations and irrigable land, 11,219 dunams for cereals, while 36 dunams were built-up (urban) land.

Jordanian era
In the wake of the 1948 Arab–Israeli War, and after the 1949 Armistice Agreements, Burqin came under Jordanian rule.

In 1961, the population of Birqin was  2,055.

Post 1967 
Since the Six-Day War in 1967, Burqin has been under Israeli occupation.

On 21 July 2015 the  21-year-old Mohammed Ahmed Alauna of  Burqin was shot dead during a confrontation with Israel forces who had entered the town on a night-time arrest mission.

People from Burqin
Hana Shalabi

Tourism
Burqin municipality and the Palestinian tourism ministry are working on making the Byzantine-era Burqin Church (St. George's Church) a popular tourist destination. Facilities in the town will be improved to be able to receive more tourists. The United States Agency for International Development (USAID) are funding a project to renovate an old building into a centre for tourists, where they can be offered general lectures and movie screenings before visiting the church and other historical places in the town.

The municipality are talking to UNESCO about listing the town as a World Heritage Site.

References

Bibliography

External links
Burqin Municipality website 
  Welcome To Burqin
Burqin, Welcome to Palestine
Burqin Church, Jenin visitor centre
Survey of Western Palestine, Map 8:   IAA, Wikimedia commons
Map, 1946

Towns in the West Bank
Jenin Governorate
Amarna letters locations
Municipalities of the State of Palestine